Arthur Henry Braman (August 4, 1897 – August 12, 1967) was an American football player.  

Braman was born in Torrington, Connecticut, in 1897. He attended Phillips Exeter Academy in New Hampshire. He was elected captain of the 196 Phillip Exeter football team. He later played college football for Yale.

He also professional football as a tackle for the Racine Legion in the National Football League (NFL). He appeared in 14 NFL games, 13 as a starter, during the 1922 and 1923 seasons.

He died in 1967 in Carmel Highlands, California.

References

1897 births
1967 deaths
Players of American football from Connecticut
Racine Legion players
Yale Bulldogs football players
People from Torrington, Connecticut